The 2016 Australian Production Car Series was an Australian motor racing series for modified production touring cars. It was the first Australian Production Car Series to be contested following the cancellation of the Australian Production Car Championship at the end of 2015.

The Series was won by Beric Lynton driving a BMW 1M.

Classes
Entries competed in six classes:
 A Class for Extreme Performance
 B Class for High Performance
 C Class for Performance
 D Class for Production
 E Class for Compac
 F Class for Diesel
 I Class for Invitational.

Teams and drivers

Race calendar 
The series was contested over four rounds.

Series standings
The series was won by Beric Lynton driving a BMW 1M.

References

Australian Production Car Championship
Production Car Series